Noel O'Brien may refer to:
 Noel O'Brien (Australian footballer)
 Noel O'Brien (footballer, born 1956)